Thanksgiving Square may refer to:

 Thanksgiving Square (Belfast) a public space in Belfast in Northern Ireland
 Thanks-Giving Square a public space in Dallas in Texas